"If You're Out There" is the second single from John Legend's album, Evolver, which features the Agape Choir. The song was released digitally on August 24, 2008. It was inspired by Barack Obama's presidential campaign and was later posted as a free download on Obama's website. The song also alludes to Gandhi's quote, "Be the change you want to see in the world," with the lines "We don't have to wait for destiny / we should / be the change that we / want to see.

Performances

Democratic National Convention

The song was performed live during the Democratic National Convention in Denver on August 25, 2008. The performance featured the Agape International Choir.

2008 Latin Grammy Awards
John Legend appeared to perform the song in duet with Colombian rock singer Juanes during the 9th Annual Latin Grammy Awards at the Toyota Center in Houston, Texas on November 13, 2008. The version they performed was sung mostly in Spanish by both singers, with only a few lines in English.

2009 NBA All-Star Game
John Legend appeared at halftime of the 2009 NBA All-Star Game and performed the song. Lyrics were alternated between English and Spanish, with the Spanish portions sung by Juanes. The song has been used in "NBA Cares" PSAs which encourage community service.

Charts

References

External links
 John Legend performs "If You're Out There" at the 2008 CNN Heroes All-Star Tribute

Pop ballads
Contemporary R&B ballads
2008 singles
John Legend songs
Songs written by John Legend
Song recordings produced by Trevor Horn
GOOD Music singles
Sony Music singles
2008 songs
Gospel songs